Homaloxestis luzonensis is a moth in the family Lecithoceridae. It was described by Kyu-Tek Park and Bong-Kyu Byun in 2007. It is found on Luzon in the Philippines.

The wingspan is 17–18 mm. The forewings are yellowish brown, the costa with a pale orange band along the margin. The hindwings are greyish orange.

Etymology
The species name is derived from the island of Luzon where the type locality is situated.

References

Moths described in 2007
Homaloxestis